Dasypyga independencia is a species of snout moth in the genus Dasypyga. It was described by Herbert H. Neunzig in 1996 and is known from the Dominican Republic.

The length of the forewings is 11–12.5 mm. The basal and subbasal area of the forewings is brownish purple, while the median area is mostly reddish brown, ochre and pale purple. The hindwings are dark brownish grey.

The larvae possibly feed on mistletoe.

Etymology
The name refers to the type locality, Independencia Province.

References

Moths described in 1996
Phycitinae